"White Limo" is a song by the American rock band Foo Fighters. It is the second single from their seventh studio album Wasting Light. The single was released on March 28, 2011 as an iTunes digital download.

Composition
In an interview with Classic Rock, Dave Grohl stated that the lyrics for "White Limo" were written in just two minutes. MTV writer Chris Ryan noted that the song showed Dave Grohl going back to his roots in hardcore punk, describing it as "...a blistering, paint-stripping thrash track that mixes mosh-inducing hard-core with the Foo’s penchant for melody." Revolver described the song as "the most metal track on "Wasting Light", and one of the most metal Foo Fighters' songs ever." The song has also been categorized as simply hard rock.

Release

On February 12, 2011, a music video was released for "White Limo", featuring Lemmy of Motörhead. It was the first full song released from Wasting Light, however, it was the second official single, released on March 28, 2011. It was preceded by "Rope" earlier that month.

English musician Liam Howlett, best known as a member of the Prodigy, remixed the song upon Dave Grohl's request and released it on October 16, 2011.

Reception

"White Limo" was chosen as the winner of the Grammy Award for Best Hard Rock/Metal Performance in 2012.

Merchandise

The Foo Fighters have made available from their official merchandise website a die-cast White Limo Figurine.

Charts

Awards

References

Foo Fighters songs
American heavy metal songs
Hardcore punk songs
2011 singles
Songs written by Dave Grohl
Song recordings produced by Butch Vig
Songs written by Pat Smear
Songs written by Taylor Hawkins
Songs written by Nate Mendel
Songs written by Chris Shiflett
RCA Records singles